The demographics of Sierra Leone are made up of an indigenous population from 18 ethnic groups. The Temne in the north and the Mende in the south are the largest. About 60,000 are Krio, the descendants of freed slaves who returned to Sierra Leone from Great Britain, North America and slave ships captured on the high seas. In addition, about 5,000 Lebanese, 1,000 Indians, and 5,000 Europeans reside in the country.

In the past, some Sierra Leoneans were noted for their educational achievements, trading activity, entrepreneurial skills, and arts and crafts work, particularly woodcarving. Many are part of larger ethnic networks extending into several countries, which link West African states in the area. Their level of education and infrastructure have declined sharply over the last 30 years.

Population 

The proportion of children below the age of 15 in 2010 was 43%, 55.1% was between 15 and 65 years of age, while 1.9% was 65 years or older
.

Population Estimates by Sex and Age Group (01.VII.2020):

Vital statistics 
Registration of vital events is in Sierra Leone not complete.
The website Our World in Data prepared the following estimates based on statistics from the Population Department of the United Nations.

Fertility and Births 
Total Fertility Rate (TFR) (Wanted Fertility Rate) and Crude Birth Rate (CBR):

Other demographic statistics 
Demographic statistics according to the World Population Review in 2022.

One birth every 2 minutes	
One death every 6 minutes	
One net migrant every 131 minutes	
Net gain of one person every 3 minutes

The following demographic are from the CIA World Factbook unless otherwise indicated.

Population
8,692,606 (2022 est.) 
6,312,212 (July 2018 est.)

Religions 

Muslim 77.1%, Christian 22.9% (2019 est.)

Age structure

0-14 years: 41.38% (male 1,369,942/female 1,371,537)
15-24 years: 18.83% (male 610,396/female 636,880)
25-54 years: 32.21% (male 1,020,741/female 1,112,946)
55-64 years: 3.89% (male 121,733/female 135,664)
65 years and over: 3.7% (2020 est.) (male 100,712/female 144,382)

0-14 years: 41.71% (male 1,314,905 /female 1,317,921)
15-24 years: 18.6% (male 572,274 /female 602,105)
25-54 years: 32.23% (male 973,698 /female 1,060,688)
55-64 years: 3.7% (male 110,176 /female 123,268)
65 years and over: 3.76% (male 97,922 /female 139,255) (2018 est.)

Birth rate 
32.2 births/1,000 population (2022 est.) Country comparison to the world: 24th
36 births/1,000 population (2018 est.) Country comparison to the world: 18th
38.12 births/1,000 population (2012 est.)

Death rate 
9.32 deaths/1,000 population (2022 est.) Country comparison to the world: 50th
10.2 deaths/1,000 population (2018 est.) Country comparison to the world: 33rd
11.41 deaths/1,000 population (2017 est.)

Total fertility rate 
3.8 children born/woman (2022 est.) Country comparison to the world: 31st
4.69 children born/woman (2018 est.) Country comparison to the world: 21st
4.9 children born/woman (2012 est.)

Population growth rate 
2.49% (2022 est.) Country comparison to the world: 23rd
2.4% (2018 est.) Country comparison to the world: 27th
2.33%  growth rate (2014 est.)

Median age
total: 19.1 years. Country comparison to the world: 206th
male: 18.5 years
female: 19.7 years (2020 est.)

total: 19.1 years. Country comparison to the world: 201st
male: 18.4 years
female: 19.7 years (2018 est.)

Mother's mean age at first birth
19.6 years (2019 est.)
note: median age at first birth among women 20-49

Contraceptive prevalence rate
21.2% (2019)
16.6% (2013)

Net migration rate 
2.03 migrant(s)/1,000 population (2022 est.) Country comparison to the world: 50th
-1.8 migrant(s)/1,000 population (2018 est.) Country comparison to the world: 160th
-3.86 migrants/1,000 population (2012 est.)

Dependency ratios
total dependency ratio: 82.6 (2015 est.)
youth dependency ratio: 78 (2015 est.)
elderly dependency ratio: 4.6 (2015 est.)
potential support ratio: 21.9 (2015 est.)

Sex ratio 
at birth: 1.03 male(s)/female
under 15 years: 0.99 male(s)/female
15–64 years: 0.92 male(s)/female
65 years and over: 0.78 male(s)/female
total population: 0.94 male(s)/female (2011 est.)

Maternal Mortality Ratio 
890 deaths/100 000 births (2010)

Sierra Leone's MMR is the worst of any country in the world, according to the 2000 WHO, UNICEF and UNFPA report.

Life expectancy at birth 
total population: 58.76 years. Country comparison to the world: 223rd
male: 57.16 years
female: 60.41 years (2022 est.)

total population: 59 years
male: 56.4 years
female: 61.7 years (2018 est.)

total population: 56.55 years
male: 54.08 years
female: 59.11 years (2012 est.)

total population: 45.25 years
male: 42.37 years
female: 48.21 years (2000 est.)

Urbanization
urban population: 43.8% of total population (2022)
rate of urbanization: 3.02% annual rate of change (2020-25 est.)

urban population: 42.1% of total population (2018)
rate of urbanization: 3.12% annual rate of change (2015-20 est.)

Education expenditures
4.6% of GDP (2017)

Health expenditures 
11.1% of GDP (2014)

Physicians density 
0.02 physicians/1,000 population (2010)

Hospital bed density 
0.4 beds/1,000 population (2008)

HIV/AIDS 
adult prevalence rate: 1.4% (2017 est.)
people living with HIV/AIDS: 61,000 (2017 est.)
deaths: 2,600 (2017 est.)

Major infectious diseases 
degree of risk: very high (2020)
food or waterborne diseases: bacterial and protozoal diarrhea, hepatitis A, and typhoid fever
vectorborne diseases: malaria and dengue fever
water contact diseases: schistosomiasis
animal contact diseases: rabies
aerosolized dust or soil contact diseases: Lassa fever

note: on 21 March 2022, the US Centers for Disease Control and Prevention (CDC) issued a Travel Alert for polio in Africa; Sierra Leone is currently considered a high risk to travelers for circulating vaccine-derived polioviruses (cVDPV); vaccine-derived poliovirus (VDPV) is a strain of the weakened poliovirus that was initially included in oral polio vaccine (OPV) and that has changed over time and behaves more like the wild or naturally occurring virus; this means it can be spread more easily to people who are unvaccinated against polio and who come in contact with the stool or respiratory secretions, such as from a sneeze, of an “infected” person who received oral polio vaccine; the CDC recommends that before any international travel, anyone unvaccinated, incompletely vaccinated, or with an unknown polio vaccination status should complete the routine polio vaccine series; before travel to any high-risk destination, CDC recommends that adults who previously completed the full, routine polio vaccine series receive a single, lifetime booster dose of polio vaccine

Nationality 
noun: Sierra Leonean(s)
adjective: Sierra Leonean

Ethnic groups 

18 native African tribes 90% (Temne 36%, Mende 33%, Limba 6.4%, Kono 4.4% other 20%)
Creole 1.2% (descendants of freed Jamaican slaves who were settled in the Freetown area in the late-18th century)
Refugees from Liberia's recent civil war
Small numbers of Europeans, Lebanese, Pakistanis, and Indians

Languages 

English (official, regular use limited to literate minority)
Mende (principal vernacular in the south)
Temne (principal vernacular in the north)
Fula (principal language in Sierra Leone, it is also strongly and widely spoken across West Africa and beyond...)
Krio (English-based Creole, spoken by the descendants of freed American and West Indian slaves and Liberated Africans who were settled in the Freetown area, a lingua franca and a first language for 10% of the population but understood by 95%)

Education expenditure 
9.3% of GDP (2020) Country comparison to the world: 7th

Literacy 
Definition:
Age 15 and over can read and write English, Mende, Temne, or Arabic
total population: 43.2%
male: 51.6%
female: 39.8% (2018)

total population: 48.1%
male: 58.7%
female: 37.7% (2015 est.)

Total population: 35.1%
Male: 46.9%
Female: 24.4% (2004 est.)

Total population: 31.4%
Male: 45.4%
Female: 18.2% (1995 est.)

Unemployment, youth ages 15-24
total: 9.4%
male: 14.8%
female: 6.1% (2014 est.)

References